is a Japanese molecular biologist, known for his discovering the DNA sequence of Clustered Regularly Interspaced Short Palindromic Repeats (CRISPR).

Biography 
Ishino was born in Kyoto Prefecture, Japan. He received his BS, MS and PhD in 1981, 1983 and 1986, respectively, from Osaka University. From 1987 to 1989, he served as a post-doctoral fellow in Dieter Söll's laboratory at Yale University.

In 2002, he became a professor at Kyushu University. Since October 2013, he has been a member of the NASA Astrobiology Institute, University of Illinois at Urbana–Champaign.

After completing his PhD, Ishino became senior research scientist at the Bioproducts Development Center of Takara Shuzo. Later in life, he joined BERI (Biomolecular Engineering Research Institute), in which he conducted research on nucleic acids-related enzymes.

Research contribution 
Ishino has contributed to the development of enzymology and nucleic acids research in his life. The "iap" gene in gut microbe E. coli was sequenced by Ishino and his colleagues in 1987. As the DNA segment used was longer than the gene itself, they accidentally discovered a partial DNA sequence of then-unnamed CRISPR in the process, which would eventually become the basis of CRISPR gene editing. Ishino was one of the first scientists to have detected CRISPRs in E. coli. In 1990, Ishino began researching DNA replication of micro-organisms in the Archaea domain.

Recognition 
 2017 - AMED Award, Japan Agency for Medical Research and Development (AMED)
 2018 - JSBBA Award, Japan Society for Bioscience, Biotechnology and Agrochemistry (JSBBA)

References

Further reading
 Prof. Yoshizumi Ishino, Faculty of Agriculture, Kyushu University
 Ishino Lab HP

1959 births
Living people
People from Kyoto
Japanese molecular biologists
Academic staff of Kyushu University
Osaka University alumni
Yale University fellows